The Theatre Guild is a theatrical society founded in New York City in 1918 by Lawrence Langner, Philip Moeller, Helen Westley and Theresa Helburn. Langner's wife, Armina Marshall, then served as a co-director. It evolved out of the work of the Washington Square Players.

History

Its original purpose was to produce non-commercial works by American and foreign playwrights. It differed from other theaters at the time in that its board of directors shared the responsibility of choosing plays, management, and production. The Theatre Guild contributed greatly to the success of Broadway from the 1920s throughout the 1970s.

The Guild has produced a total of 228 plays on Broadway, including 18 by George Bernard Shaw and seven by Eugene O'Neill. Other major playwrights introduced to theatre-going Americans include Robert E. Sherwood, Maxwell Anderson, Sidney Howard, William Saroyan, and Philip Barry. In the field of musical theatre, the Guild has promoted works by Richard Rodgers, teamed with both Lorenz Hart and Oscar Hammerstein II, George and Ira Gershwin, Jule Styne, and Meredith Willson, all of which have become classics. Warren Caro served as the organization's executive director from 1946 through 1967. Under President John F. Kennedy, the Guild was engaged to assemble a U.S. theatre company, headed by Helen Hayes, to tour the capitals of Europe and South America with works by Tennessee Williams, Thornton Wilder, and William Gibson. 

In 1968, the Guild became involved in the travel field by taking 25 of its subscribers to European capitals to see plays. In 1975, it instituted its Theatre At Sea program with a 17-day cruise aboard the Rotterdam with Hayes and Cyril Ritchard. Since then they have hosted more than thirty cruises, each with seven or eight performers. Among them have been Alan Arkin, Zoe Caldwell, Anne Jackson, Cherry Jones, Richard Kiley, Eartha Kitt, Patricia Neal, Lynn Redgrave, Gena Rowlands, Jean Stapleton, Eli Wallach, and Lee Roy Reams, who served as the program's resident director.

The last Broadway play produced by The Theatre Guild was State Fair in 1996.

Notable productions

1920: Heartbreak House
1921: Liliom
1922: R.U.R. (Rossum's Universal Robots)
1922: He Who Gets Slapped
1923: Saint Joan
1925: Processional
1927: Porgy
1928: Strange Interlude
1931: Mourning Becomes Electra
1933: Ah, Wilderness!
1935: Porgy and Bess
1936: The Masque of Kings; Idiot's Delight
1939: The Philadelphia Story; The Time of Your Life
1943: Oklahoma!
1943: Othello
1944: Jacobowsky and the Colonel
1945: Carousel
1946: The Iceman Cometh
1947: The Winslow Boy
1950: Come Back, Little Sheba
1953: Picnic; The Trip to Bountiful
1955: The Matchmaker
1956: Bells Are Ringing
1958: Sunrise at Campobello
1960: The Unsinkable Molly Brown
1965: The Royal Hunt of the Sun
1974: Absurd Person Singular

References

External links

Encyclopædia Britannica entry
 Finding Aid to the Theresa Helburn Theatre Guild Collection, Bryn Mawr College
Theatre Guild records, 1949-1952, held by the Billy Rose Theatre Division, New York Public Library for the Performing Arts
Theatre Guild technical drawings and other production materials, circa 1925-1953, held by the Billy Rose Theatre Division, New York Public Library for the Performing Arts
Sara Greenspan Theatre Guild files, 1925-1969, held by the Billy Rose Theatre Division, New York Public Library for the Performing Arts
Theatre Guild Archive., Yale Collection of American Literature, Beinecke Rare Book and Manuscript Library.

Broadway theatre
Guilds in the United States
Special Tony Award recipients
Defunct Theatre companies in New York City